Adriano Banelli (born 5 June 1948) is an Italian former footballer who played as a midfielder and a football manager.

Club career 
Overall, Banelli spent 12 seasons with U.S. Catanzaro 1929 between 1967 and 1979 and is the leading league appearance holder for Catanzaro with 336. He also holds the record for most number of Coppa Italia appearances for Catanzaro with 39. Thus he also holds the record for the total number of appearances for Catanzaro with 378. After the 1978–79 season, Banelli moved to fellow Calabrian club, Reggina 1914, who were competing in Serie C. He made 20 appearances for Reggina before moving to Cavese 1919 for the following season, where he made 29 appearances and scored two goals.

Managerial career 
Banelli has taken over as manager of U.S. Catanzaro 1929 on three separate occasions. This occurred twice in the 1992–93 season, when he first took over from Franco Selvaggi for the round 7 match on 20 October. Banelli was in charge for 16 matches before the club hired Paolo Dal Fiume in February 1993. Dal Fiume would only last 9 matches in charge before Banelli took over for the final 9 matches of the season. Banelli again took the manager position for Catanzaro for a third time on 5 April 1996 for the final 7 games of the 1995–96 season.

Across three spells, Banelli managed 32 matches for Catanzaro, with a record of 12 wins, 11 draws and 9 losses.

Career statistics

Club 

Notes

Managerial statistics

Honours 
S.S.D. Calcio Città di Castello
 Serie D: 1966–67 (Girone C)
Cavese 1919
 Serie C1: 1980–81 (Girone B)

References  

1948 births
Living people
Association football midfielders
Italian football managers
Italian footballers
U.S. Catanzaro 1929 players
Reggina 1914 players
Cavese 1919 players
Serie A players
Serie B players
Serie C players
Serie D players
U.S. Catanzaro 1929 managers
Serie C managers